Jietai Temple is a Buddhist temple in Mentougou District in western Beijing.  It was constructed during the Tang dynasty, with major modifications made during the Ming and Qing Dynasties.

Like the older Tanzhe Temple nearby along China National Highway 108, Jietai Temple is now a tourist attraction of Beijing.

The temple is located on the mountainside of the Ma'an mountain approximately 25 kilometers from downtown Beijing. It was first built in the Kaihuang period of the Sui Dynasty (581-600) and was originally called the Huiju Temple (Wisdom Accumulation Temple).

The ordination altar in Jietai Temple is known as one of the three largest ordination altars in China together with the other two in Kaiyuan Temple in Quanzhou, Fujian and Zhaoqing Temple in Hangzhou, Zhejiang. As it has largest construction scale, so it is also called the "First Altar in the World".

History
Jietai Temple was first built in 622, in the 5th year of Wude period in the Tang dynasty (618–907) with the name of "Huiju Temple".

In 1069, in the 5th year of Xianyong period in the Liao dynasty (907–1125), master Fajun founded the ordination altar in the temple. Monks from different areas gathered here to observe the precepts, hence the name "Jietan Temple" (Jietan means the ordination altar).

Architecture

Jietan Hall (Hall of Ordination Altar)
Jietan Hall is the most important hall in Jietai Temple. It was first built in 1069, in the 5th year of Xianyong period in the Liao dynasty (907–1125) and was renovated in the Jin dynasty (1115–1234), Yuan dynasty (1279–1368), Ming dynasty (1368–1644) and Qing dynasty (1644–1911). It still preserves the architectural style of the Liao dynasty.

Inside the hall, a plaque with "" ( means after observing precepts in the temple, monks can write their own books) written by Qianlong Emperor is hung on the architrave. Another plaque with "" written by Kangxi Emperor is hung in the interior side of the architrave.

The three layers of the ordination altar are all shaped in Sumeru thrones with carved patterns of clouds and grass. It is surrounded by niches enshrining colored clay sculptures of "deities of precepts". In front of the Buddha statue, ten red sandalwood chairs and ten dragon-carved desks are put for the 10 precept masters who will witness the precepts ceremony, namely three masters to witness the ceremony and seven to prove it.

Other

Pine trees
Jietai Temple is also renowned for its old and grotesque pine trees. They were mostly planted in the Tang dynasty (618–907) and Song dynasty (960–1279), and have formed a varied grotesque appearance in the thousand years since. In the Ming and Qing dynasties (1368–1911), the "Ten Grotesque Pine Trees" were known to the world, which attracted many literati to come and compose poems to eulogize them. Some well-known old pine trees are Leisure Pine Tree, Lying Dragon Pine Tree, Nine Dragon Pine Tree, Pagoda Embracing Pine Tree, Active Pine Tree and so on.

Gallery

References

7th-century Buddhist temples
Major National Historical and Cultural Sites in Beijing
Buddhist temples in Beijing
Mentougou District
Religious buildings and structures completed in 622